Gemena is the capital city of Sud-Ubangi Province in the  Democratic Republic of the Congo. It has a population of 350,511 (2017). The city has a large airport and hosts the 10th integrated Brigade of the new FARDC since 2007.

Mobutu Sese Seko's mother, Mama Yemo, died in Gemena in 1971; a vast mausoleum was built in her memory.

References

Crawford Young and Thomas Turner, The Rise and Decline of the Zairian State, p. 174)
http://fr.allafrica.com/stories/200705161046.html

Populated places in Sud-Ubangi